Duke Ellington Circle is a traffic circle located at the northeast corner of Central Park at the intersection of Fifth Avenue and 110th Street in Harlem, Manhattan, New York City. The traffic circle is named for the jazz musician Duke Ellington.



Plaza
Formerly named "Frawley Circle", the traffic circle was renamed "Duke Ellington Circle" in 1995.  In 1997, the Duke Ellington Memorial by sculptor Robert Graham was erected in the middle of the shallow amphitheater composing the circle. Though the circle diverts the flow of 110th Street, Fifth Avenue maintains a direct route through the intersection.

A new main location for the Museum for African Art designed by Robert A.M. Stern Architects is scheduled to open at the circle in 2011 and will be the first addition to New York City's Museum Mile in decades.

Neighborhoods
Duke Ellington Circle connects the New York City neighborhoods of Harlem with East Harlem.  Harlem, which since the 1920s has been as a major African-American residential, cultural, and business center is to the north and west of the intersection, while East Harlem is located to the east. The nearest area of Central Park to the circle is the Harlem Meer.

Transportation
The M1, M2, M3 and M4 New York City Bus routes serve the vicinity of the circle.

References 

Central Park
Harlem
Roundabouts and traffic circles in the United States
Streets in Manhattan